The Temple of Divus Augustus was a temple commemorating the deified first Roman emperor, Augustus. It was constructed in Nola in Campania, where Augustus had died in AD 14. The temple was erected on the place where Augustus died and was dedicated by his successor Tiberius in 26. If still in use by the 4th- and 5th century, it would have been closed during the persecution of pagans in the late Roman Empire.

References

1st-century Roman temples
Nola
Ancient Roman buildings and structures in Italy
Temples in Italy